Anxiety Always is an album released by the Detroit, Michigan electronic duo ADULT. in September 2003.  Although the band had released the album Resuscitation in 2001, this release is considered to be their true full-length debut album, as Resuscitation was essentially a compilation of past single releases.

ADULT. consists of instrumentalist Adam Lee Miller and vocalist Nicola Kuperus.  Kuperus is also a visual artist and provided the album's cover art photography.  Upon its release Anxiety Always received positive reviews from critics, who praised the duo's expansion of their mostly-synthesizer-based sound, as the album contains prominent guitar and bass guitar elements.

Anxiety Always was released independently by Miller and Kurperus on their Ersatz Audio record label.

Track listing
All songs by Miller and Kurperus.

Compact disc
"The Cold Call"
"Shake Your Head"
"Glue Your Eyelids Together"
"Blank-Eyed Nosebleed"
"Turn Your Back"
"People, You Can Confuse"
"Nothing of the Kind"
"Nervous (Wreck)"
"We Know How to Have Fun"
"Kick in the Shin"

Bonus tracks
The Australian version of this album came with two bonus tracks.
"Foot in Mouth Disease"
"Suck the Air"

Vinyl
"Glue Your Eyelids Together"
"Blank-Eyed Nosebleed"
"(Nervous) Wreck"
"People, You Can Confuse"
"We Know How to Have Fun"
"Shake Your Head"
"Turn Your Back"
"Nothing of the Kind"
"Kick in the Shin"
"Foot-in-Mouth Disease"

Personnel 

 Jason Brougham: Prop Design
 Sandi Brougham: Photography
 Nicola Kuperus: Vocals, Photography
 Adam Lee Miller: Bass, Sound Effects, Design

References

External links
[ Anxiety Always] at Allmusic
Anxiety Always at Official ADULT. Site

2003 debut albums
Adult (band) albums